Edward Joseph Cook (June 29, 1932 – September 7, 2007) was a professional American football offensive lineman in the National Football League (NFL).

Born in Philadelphia, Cook attended high school at Southeast Catholic and then the University of Notre Dame. Cook made his professional debut in the NFL in 1958 with the Chicago Cardinals. He played for the Cardinals (1958–65), and the Atlanta Falcons (1966–67).

External links

1932 births
2007 deaths
Players of American football from Philadelphia
American football offensive tackles
American football offensive guards
Notre Dame Fighting Irish football players
Chicago Cardinals players
St. Louis Cardinals (football) players
Atlanta Falcons players